Irbek Farniev (born January 12, 1980, in Vladikavkaz) is a male freestyle wrestler from Russia. He participated in Men's freestyle 66 kg at 2008 Summer Olympics. After winning two fights he was eliminated in the 1/4 of final losing with Leonid Spiridonov.

He was gold medalist of 2003 FILA Wrestling World Championships in New York city and bronze medalist of 2007 FILA Wrestling World Championships

External links
 Wrestler profile on beijing2008.com
 

1980 births
Living people
Sportspeople from Vladikavkaz
Ossetian people
Russian male sport wrestlers
Olympic wrestlers of Russia
Wrestlers at the 2008 Summer Olympics
World Wrestling Championships medalists
21st-century Russian people